Sir Joseph Leigh (1841 – 22 September 1908) was a British Liberal Party politician and cotton spinner.

Background
He was the eldest son of Thomas Leigh, cotton spinner at Meadow Mill in Stockport. He was educated at Stockport Grammar School. He married in 1868, Alice Ann Adamson. They had four sons and two daughters. He was knighted in 1894. He was also made a Chevalier of the Legion of Honour, in France.

Civic career
He was a member, latterly an Alderman of the Borough of Stockport Council for 29 years. He served as the borough's Mayor from 1885 to 1889. He also served as a Justice of the Peace for Cheshire and Stockport. He was made an Honourable Freeman of the Borough of Stockport. He was Chairman and promoter of Stockport Technical School. He was a Director of the Manchester Ship Canal.

Political career
At parliamentary elections he contested, as a Liberal party candidate, the dual member seat of Stockport in 1885, 1886, 1892, 1895 and 1900. He sat as Liberal MP for Stockport from 1892 to 1895 and from 1900 to 1906. 

He stood down at the General Election of January 1906. 
He did not stand for parliament again.

References

1841 births
1908 deaths
Liberal Party (UK) MPs for English constituencies
UK MPs 1900–1906
UK MPs 1892–1895
Members of the Parliament of the United Kingdom for Stockport